Generaloberstabsarzt and Admiraloberstabsarzt are the top Joint Medical Service OF8-ranks of the German Bundeswehr. The equivalent to this ranks in the Heer is Generalleutnant and in the German Navy the Vizeadmiral.

Bundeswehr 
In accordance with traditions in German armed forces, both ranks might be used in Bundeswehr medical service. Normally the Bundeswehr Surgeon General of the medical service (de: Inspekteur des Sanitätsdienstes), or the Chief of Medical Operation´s Command (de: Kommandeur Sanitätsführungskommando) might be assigned. However, in future the Chief position might remain vacant, because the Deputy Surgeon General is mandated to command the Medical Operation´s Command.

Equivalent to that three-star ranks (NATO-Rangcode OF-8) are Generalleutnant ("Lieutenant general") of the Heer or Luftwaffe, and the Vizeadmiral (en: Vice admiral) of the Marine.

Address 
The manner of formal addressing of military surgeons with the rank Generalarzt (OF-6, one-star rank), Generalstabsarzt (OF-7, two-star rank) or Generaloberstabsarzt is, „Herr/Frau Generalarzt“. At the other hand, military surgeons with the rank Admiralarzt (OF-6, one-star rank), Admiralstabsarzt (OF-7, two-star rank) or Admiraloberstabsarzt is, „Herr/Frau Admiralarzt“. Although the grammatically female form of Arzt is Ärztin, the military does not have separate gendered ranks, so the correct form of address for a female doctor is „Frau Stabsarzt“.

Rank insignias 
On the shoulder straps (Heer, Luftwaffe) there are three golden stars in golden oak leaves and the career insignia (de: Laufbahnabzeichen) as symbol of the medical standing, or course of studies. Regarding the Marine, the career insignia is in the middle of both sleeves, three centimeters above the cuff strips, and on the shoulder straps between strips and button.

Wehrmacht 

The General of the branch grade Generaloberstabsarzt was the most senior ranks of the medical service of the German Wehrmacht 1933 to 1945.

Siegfried Handloser was assigned to Generaloberstabsarzt of the Wehrmacht. He was simultaneous "Chief of the Wehrmachts Medical Service in Supreme Command of the Wehrmacht" (Chef des Wehrmachtsanitätswesens im Oberkommando der Wehrmacht) as of July 28, 1942. Curt Schulze was Generaloberstabveterinär of the Wehrmacht.

Comparative ranks
Generaloberstabsarzt of the Wehrmacht was comparable to the General of the branch (OF8, tree stars), as well as to the Obergruppenführer and General of the Waffen-SS.

In line to the so-called Reichsbesoldungsordnung (en: Reich's salary order), appendixes to the Salary law of the German Empire (de: Besoldungsgesetz des Deutschen Reiches) of 1927 (changes 1937 – 1940), the comparative ranks were as follows: C 1

General of the branch (Heer and Luftwaffe)
Admiral (Kriegsmarine)
Generaloberstabsarzt, from 1934 (medical service of the Wehrmacht)
Generaloberstabsveterinär, from 1934 (veterinarian service of the Wehrmacht)

See also main article Ranks and insignia of the German Army (1935–1945)

Kriegsmarine 
Rank designations of the Kriegsmarine as to Match 30, 1934, are contained in the table below.

Other armed forces 

 Surgeon General of the United States
 Surgeon General (Canada)
 Surgeon-General (United Kingdom)
 Chief Medical Officer (Ireland)
 Chief Medical Officer (United Kingdom)

Relevant literature 
 Neumann, Alexander: Arzttum ist immer Kämpfertum - Die Heeressanitätsinspektion und das Amt "Chef des Wehrmachtsanitätswesens" im Zweiten Weltkrieg (1939-1945), 2005. 
 Süß, Winfried: Der "Völkskörper" im Krieg: Gesundheitspolitik, Gesundheitsverhältnisse und Krankenmord im nationalsozialistischen Deutschland 1939–1945'', 2003.

References 

Three-star officers
Military ranks of Germany
Three-star officers of Nazi Germany
Three-star officers of the Bundeswehr